Presbyterian Church in Korea (HwanWon) was founded by Pastor Song Jae-Muk, who separated from the Presbyterian Church in Korea (HoHun). In 1969 the General Assembly of HwanWon accepted the services of a missionary of the Westminster Presbyterian World Mission, namely Robert S. Rapp. HwanWon suffered several splits. The denomination lost most of its strength and the new moderator decided to united with the JungAng presbytery and the JeongTong. The united church become the Presbyterian Church in Korea (HapDongHwanWon).

References 

Presbyterian denominations in South Korea
Presbyterian denominations in Asia